James Feehan (born 16 August 1995) is an Irish Gaelic footballer who plays as a left corner-back for the Tipperary senior team.

Born in Killenaule, County Tipperary, Feehan first played competitive Gaelic football during his schooling at Rockwell College. He arrived on the inter-county scene at the age of sixteen when he first linked up with the Tipperary minor team before later joining the under-21 and junior sides. He made his senior debut during the 2015 championship. Feehan immediately became a regular member of the starting fifteen.

At club level Feehan plays with Killenaule.

On 31 July 2016, he started in the half-back line as Tipperary defeated Galway in the 2016 All-Ireland Quarter-finals at Croke Park to reach their first All-Ireland semi-final since 1935.
On 21 August 2016, Tipperary were beaten in the semi-final by Mayo on a 2-13 to 0-14 scoreline.

On 22 November 2020, Tipperary won the 2020 Munster Senior Football Championship after a 0-17 to 0-14 win against Cork in the final. It was Tipperary's first Munster title in 85 years.

Honours

Player

Tipperary
Munster Under-21 Football Championship (1): 2015
Munster Minor Football Championship (1): 2012
Munster Senior Football Championship (1): 2020

References

1995 births
Living people
Killenaule Gaelic footballers
Tipperary inter-county Gaelic footballers